The United States Army created a large number of notional deception formations that were used in a number of World War II deception operations. The most notable fictional US formation was the First U.S. Army Group (FUSAG); this field army was originally intended as the main invasion force for the Invasion of Normandy, however that was renamed to the 12th Army Group. FUSAG remained in existence on paper and was used during Operation Fortitude South to divert Axis attention to the Pas de Calais area.

The imaginary formations ranged in size from battalion to field army and were faked using documents, photographs, double agents, news reportage and physical subterfuge. Some of the units were either based on existing decommissioned formations (usually World War I formations) or created afresh. Many were used multiple times, Clarke in particular believed that reusing units in the long term would help establish their existence in the mind of the enemy.

Field armies and army groups

Corps

Divisions

References 

Bibliography
 
 
 
 
 

 Military units and formations of the United States Army in World War II
Fictional units of World War II